David Wolfson may refer to:

 David Wolfson, Baron Wolfson of Sunningdale (1935–2021), British politician and businessman
 David Wolfson, Baron Wolfson of Tredegar (born 1968), British lawyer and politician
 David Wolfson, author, book Life in the Fat Lane: The Paul Kimelman Story (1991)

See also
 David Wolffsohn